Sabine Kunst (born 30 December 1954) is a German engineer, academic and politician who has been serving as chairwoman of the Joachim Herz Foundation since 2022.

Kunst served as president of Humboldt University from 2016 until 2021, when she announced her resignation over the reform of the Berlin university law. Since 2014, she has been a member of the Social Democratic Party of Germany (SPD).

Education
1990: Habilitation in civil engineering
1990: PhD in political science
1982: PhD in civil engineering

Political career
From 2010 to 2011, Kunst served as president of the German Academic Exchange Service (DAAD); she was the first woman to hold that office. She unsuccessfully applied for the position as president of the University of Leipzig in 2010; instead, the position went to Beate Schücking.

From 2011 to 2016, Kunst served as State Minister of Science, Research and Culture in the government of Brandenburg, in the governments of successive Ministers-President Matthias Platzeck and Dietmar Woidke.

Other activities
 German Institute for International and Security Affairs (SWP), Member of the Council (since 2022)
 Berlin Institute of Health (BIH), Member of the Supervisory Board
 Deutsches Herzzentrum Berlin, Member of the Board of Trustees
 Foundation for the Humboldt Forum in the Berlin Palace, Member of the Council
 Fraunhofer Institute for Applied Polymer Research (IAP), Member of the Advisory Board
 German Institute for Economic Research (DIW), Member of the Board of Trustees
 German-Polish Science Foundation (DPWS), Member of the Board
 Leibniz Centre for Contemporary History, Member of the Board of Trustees
 Leo Baeck Foundation, Member of the Board of Trustees
 Max Delbrück Center for Molecular Medicine in the Helmholtz Association (MDC), Member of the Supervisory Board
 Max Planck Society, Member of the Senate
 Max Planck Institute for Gravitational Physics, Member of the Board of Trustees
 Natural History Museum, Berlin, Member of the Board of Trustees
 Potsdam Institute for Climate Impact Research (PIK), Member of the Board of Trustees
 Stiftung St. Matthäus, Evangelical Church in Berlin, Brandenburg and Silesian Upper Lusatia, Member of the Board of Trustees
 Stephanus-Stiftung, Member of the Board of Trustees
 University of Lübeck, Member of the Board of Trustees
 Urania Berlin, Member of the Board of Trustees
 Weizenbaum Institute, Member of the Board of Trustees
 Berlin Social Science Center (WZB), Member of the Board of Trustees

Recognition
 2013 – Honorary doctorate, American Jewish University

Personal life
Kunst is married and has three children. The family has been living in Werder, Havel since 2007. Her sister is Kirsten Fehrs.

References 

Academic staff of the Humboldt University of Berlin
Presidents of the Humboldt University of Berlin
German women educators
Ministers of the Brandenburg State Government
21st-century German women politicians
Living people
21st-century German politicians
Women heads of universities and colleges
1954 births